Chordeh (before 2021 — Chorqishloq) is a village in northern Tajikistan. It is part of the city of Isfara in Sughd Region.

References

Populated places in Sughd Region